The Men's Team Sprint is one of the 10 men's events at the 2010 UCI Track Cycling World Championships, held in Ballerup, Denmark.

Sixteen teams of 3 cyclists each participated in the contest. After the qualifying, the fastest 2 teams raced for gold, and 3rd and 4th teams raced for bronze.

The Qualifying and the Finals were held on the evening session on March 24.

Qualifying

Finals

References

Qualifying Results
Finals Results

Men's team sprint
UCI Track Cycling World Championships – Men's team sprint